The Lake District is a mountainous region in Northwest England.

Lake District may also refer to one of the following:
In the British Isles:
Lake District National Park, protected area of the Lake District
County Fermanagh, north-west county in Ireland, referred to as the Irish Lake District.
 In Canada:
The Nechako Lakes District in Central British Columbia, Canada
Lake District, Edmonton, residential district in Alberta, Canada
Lakes District Secondary School, in British Columbia, Canada
In Chile:
Chilean Lake District, a zone in Southern Chile defined by its many lakes
Los Lagos Region (Region of the Lakes) in Chile
In Finland:
Finnish Lakeland
In Germany:
Franconian Lake District a large Area south-west of Nuremberg, Germany
Mecklenburg Lake District, a lakeland in Mecklenburg-Vorpommern, eastern Germany
Mecklenburg Lake District II - Rostock District III, a constituency in the same area
In New Zealand:
 Queenstown-Lakes District
In Poland:
Pomeranian Lake District
Kashubian Lake District
Masurian Lake District
In Turkey:
Turkish Lakes Region
In the United States:
Lake District Hospital, in Oregon
Lakewood, Washington, previously known as Lakes District

See also
Land o' Lakes (disambiguation)
The Lakes (disambiguation)
Lake (disambiguation)
Lake Country, a municipality in British Columbia, Canada
Lake Country (Tasmania), a region in Australia